The Tiberias Marathon is an annual marathon road race held along the Sea of Galilee in Israel. At approximately 200 meters below sea level, this is the lowest course in the world. The competition was first held in 1977, and also hosts the annual Israeli marathon national championship. It was Israel's first international marathon event. 

The course follows an out-and-back format around the southern tip of the sea, and the event also includes a half-marathon (21.1 km) and 10 and 5-kilometer runs. In 2010 the 10 km race was moved from the afternoon to before the marathon. The half-marathon race was added in 2018. 

The latest edition of the event was held on 9 December 2022. David (Necho) Tayachew of Ben Shemen Youth Village and a member of the Maccabi Tel Aviv athletics club, won the men's marathon category with a personal record time of 2:13:00. Beatie Deutsch won the women's category for the fourth time in 2:41:20.

In 2007, a Kenyan-born Bahraini athlete, Mushir Salem Jawher (Leonard Mucheru Maina), won the race and was briefly stripped of his Bahrani citizenship by the Bahrani government for competing in Israel. In 2012 Patrick Tambwé, a former Congolese runner representing France, ran a course record of 2:07:30 hours – a time which was the fastest by a European since 2007.

Past winners
Key:

Wins by country

See also
Jerusalem Marathon
Tel Aviv Marathon

References

List of winners
Eiger, David & Civai, Franco (2011-01-09). Tiberias Marathon. Association of Road Racing Statisticians. Retrieved on 2011-01-15.

External links

In Ancient Footsteps, an overview by Prof. Uri Goldbourt
New Official Site

Marathons in Israel
Recurring sporting events established in 1977
Sea of Galilee
Annual sporting events in Israel